Elektroforez is a Russian synth-pop group, founded in Saint Petersburg in 2012 by Ivan Kurochkin and Vitaly Talyzin.

Career 
In 2013, the American band Xiu Xiu released an official remix of the song "Eshafot". Elektroforez performed twice at the 10th edition of Manifesta, the European Biennial of Contemporary Art, held in Saint Petersburg. In 2014, Afisha named the group's album Quo Vadis? as one of the most anticipated Russian albums. In 2016, the song "Vse bylo tak" was used in the film Gorodskie ptichki, directed by Yuliya Belaya and featuring actors from the Gogol Center in the lead roles. Since 2016, the group has been actively touring, playing over 100 concerts in Russia, Belarus, the Baltic states, Germany, and Ukraine. In 2017, the group won the Golden Gargoyle music award in the Electronic Project category. In the same year, the group performed in Tallinn Music Week.

In April 2018, Elektroforez performed in Minsk, Warsaw, Poznan, Berlin, and Kaliningrad as part of a showcase of Russian bands including Kazuskoma, Spasibo, Glintshake, and Shortparis. During the tour, the group caught the attention of a number of Polish promoters. The group also performed at Stereoleto Festival.

At the end of 2018, the group released the music video for the song "Ikea".

In 2019, Elektroforez was featured in The Quietus's series on the Russian alternative music scene.

Discography

Studio albums 
 2012 — #1
 2017 — Quo Vadis?
 2021 — 505

EPs 

 2012 — Electroforez
 2013 — EP #2
 2015 — EP #3
 2016 — EP #4
 2018 — EP #5

Singles 

 2013 — "Moskva" 
 2014 — "Vse bylo tak"
 2014 — "Pora!"
 2017 — "Russkaya printsessa"
 2017 — "Couci-Couça" 
 2019 — "Alkogol moy vrag"
 2019 — "Panicheskaya ataka"
 2019 — "Vezhlivyy Otkaz"
 2019 — "Vse budet normal'no?"

Remixes 

 Shortparis — "Amsterdam" 
 Svidanie — "Kate Moss"  
 Barto — "Sama!"

References 

Russian musical duos
Musical groups from Saint Petersburg
Musical groups established in 2012
Russian synthpop groups
2012 establishments in Russia